Tatsuma Ito was the defending champion, and successfully defended his title, defeating Sebastian Rieschick in the final 6–4, 6–2.

Seeds

Draw

Finals

Top half

Bottom half

References
 Main draw
 Qualifying draw

Men's Singles